Section 28 or Clause 28 
was a legislative designation for a series of laws across Britain that prohibited the "promotion of homosexuality" by local authorities. Introduced by Margaret Thatcher's Conservative government, it was in effect from 1988 to 2000 in Scotland and from 1988 to 2003 in England and Wales. It caused many organisations such as lesbian, gay, bisexual and transgender student support groups to close, limit their activities or self-censor.

The law is named after Section 28 of the Local Government Act 1988, which added Section 2A to the Local Government Act 1986. Enacted on 24 May 1988, the amendment stated that a local authority "shall not intentionally promote homosexuality or publish material with the intention of promoting homosexuality" or "promote the teaching in any maintained school of the acceptability of homosexuality as a pretended family relationship". It was repealed on 21 June 2000 in Scotland by the Ethical Standards in Public Life etc. (Scotland) Act 2000, one of the first pieces of legislation enacted by the new Scottish Parliament, and on 18 November 2003 in England and Wales by section 122 of the Local Government Act 2003.

History

Background
Male homosexuality had been illegal within the United Kingdom for centuries, with laws on sodomy having first been passed as the Buggery Act 1533 by Henry VIII in England. This was later compounded upon by the Criminal Law Amendment Act 1885, which criminalised "gross indecency between males", a further-reaching law that criminalised any homosexual activity between men, where previously only anal sex had been criminalised.

In 1954, the Wolfenden report began its investigation into whether or not homosexuality ought to remain an offence in British law, following the arrest and conviction of a number of high-profile men for homosexual offences, such as Lord Montagu of Beaulieu, Michael Pitt-Rivers, and Alan Turing; by the end of 1954, 1,069 men were in prison for such offences. The report, which was published in 1957, recommended that "homosexual behaviour between consenting adults in private should no longer be a criminal offence", and stated that "homosexuality cannot legitimately be regarded as a disease". Following a further decade of debate, homosexuality was decriminalised for those over the age of 21 in the Sexual Offences Act 1967; however, discrimination against gay men, and gay people in general, continued in the following decades.

Beginning in the 1980s, gay men faced a further challenge, with HIV/AIDS first reported in 1981, and the first recorded victims of the disease being a group of gay men. The disease quickly became associated within the media with gay and bisexual men in particular. Though this association was also made in medical circles at first, it was later understood that it was not gay men alone who contracted, and were at risk of, HIV and AIDS. The association of HIV/AIDS with gay and bisexual men worsened their stigmatisation, and this association correlated with higher levels of sexual prejudice, such as homophobic and biphobic attitudes.

Rising negative sentiments towards homosexuality peaked in 1987, the year before Section 28 was enacted. According to the British Social Attitudes Survey, 75% of the population said that homosexual activity was "always or mostly wrong", with just 11% believing it to be "not wrong at all". Five years prior to the enactment, a similar BSAS poll had found that 61% of Conservative and 67% of Labour voters believed homosexual activity to be "always or mostly wrong".
The law's precursor was the publication in 1979 of LEA Arrangements for the School Curriculum, which required local authorities to publish their curriculum policies. Following the legalisation of homosexuality proposals for Scotland (added as an amendment to what became the Criminal Justice (Scotland) Act 1980 by Labour MP Robin Cook), guidance was published indicating that schools should not teach homosexuality as part of sex education lessons. This was part of a deal to ensure government support for legalisation of homosexuality in Scotland.

This was followed, two years later, by the School Curriculum (25 March 1981), in which the secretaries of state (for Education and Wales) said they had decided to "set out in some detail the approach to the school curriculum which they consider should now be followed in the years ahead". Every local education authority was expected to frame policies for the school curriculum consistent with the government's "recommended approach" (DES 1981a:5) which required teaching of only heterosexual intercourse in schools.

The Greater London Council (GLC) directly started funding LGBT groups, and between 1981 and 1984 grants totalling at least £292,548 were given by the GLC to a variety of small gay groups. Another £751,000 was committed towards the setting up of the London Lesbian and Gay Community Centre in Islington. About 10 of the 32 local authorities in London, most prominently Islington and Haringey were also funding gay groups at that time, one report estimating that these boroughs and the GLC together donated more than £600,000 to gay projects and groups during 1984.

In 1983, the Daily Mail reported that a copy of a book entitled Jenny lives with Eric and Martin, portraying a young girl who lives with her father and his male partner, was provided in a school library run by the Labour-controlled Inner London Education Authority. In reality the book found by the Daily Mail turned out to be in a ILEA teachers' resource centre and never seen or used by children. More and more councils began to adopt wide-ranging anti-discrimination policies (particularly Ealing, Haringey, Islington, Camden and Manchester who employed officers to counter homophobia).

The attention to this, and the alliances between LGBT and labour unions (including the National Union of Mineworkers (NUM)) – formed by activist groups such as Lesbians and Gays Support the Miners and Lesbians Against Pit Closures – led to the adoption at the Labour Party Annual Conference in 1985 of a resolution to criminalise discrimination against lesbian, gay and bisexual people. This legislation was supported by block voting from the NUM. In addition, the election to Manchester City Council of Margaret Roff in November 1985 as the UK's first openly lesbian Mayor and the publication of Changing The World by the GLC in 1985 all fuelled a heightened public awareness of LGBT rights.

But it was not until 1986 that major controversy arose and widespread protest demonstrations made a major contribution towards the subsequent passing of Section 28.

During the 1987 election campaign, the Conservative Party (under the leadership of Margaret Thatcher) issued attack posters claiming that the Labour Party wanted the book Young, Gay and Proud to be read in schools, as well as Police: Out of School, The Playbook for Kids about Sex, and The Milkman's on his Way, which, according to the Monday Club's Jill Knight MP – who introduced Section 28 and later campaigned against same-sex marriage – were being taught to "little children as young as five and six", which contained "brightly coloured pictures of little stick men showed all about homosexuality and how it was done", and "explicitly described homosexual intercourse and, indeed, glorified it, encouraging youngsters to believe that it was better than any other sexual way of life".

A demonstration took place in Manchester led by John Shiers against Section 28 in 1988 with 25,000 people attending. A final factor was the tone taken by activist groups such as the Gay Liberation Front, cited by Jill Knight, who in 1999 spoke about the perceived purpose of Section 28:

Legislation
As a consequence of the DPP deciding that the Crown Prosecution Service could not prosecute the publishers of the Playbook for Kids about Sex, and the start of local government spending on support groups for LGBT people, papers and Conservative backbench members of Parliament became concerned that left-wing councils or schools would provide children with pro-homosexual material or commend homosexuality to children, both described by parliamentarians backing the bill as morally wrong but which could be carefully policed by judges in applying a narrow sense to the meaning of the word promote. In 1986 Lord Halsbury first tabled the Local Government Act 1986 (Amendment) Bill, whose long title was An act to refrain local authorities from promoting homosexuality, in the House of Lords, drafted for him by Lord Campbell of Alloway. At the time, the incumbent Conservative government considered Halsbury's bill to be too misleading and risky. The bill successfully passed the House of Lords and Conservative MP Dame Jill Knight had the bill pass the first stage in the Commons. However, impeded by the 1987 general election, this Bill, commonly called the Earl of Halsbury's Bill failed.  Its provisions were not reintroduced by the government on its re-election.

Instead, on 2 December 1987 in committee, Conservative MP David Wilshire proposed an amendment to the new Local Government Bill, as not yet passed, debated as Clause 27 and later as Clause 28, intended to be equivalent to the Earl of Halsbury's Bill. The government agreed to support the tabling of the amendment in exchange for Knight forgoing her place on the Health and Medicines Bill standing committee; the amendment received the support of the Ministers for Local Government, Michael Howard and Michael Portillo. On being tabled, a compromise amendment was introduced by Simon Hughes on 8 December 1987 that was debated in the House on 15 December 1987 and which was defeated by a majority of 87, and the bill was approved on its first Commons debate that day.  The bill was read a first time in the Lords two days later.

Lord McIntosh of Haringey took up the mantle of Simon Hughes' amendments in the Lords' second reading, furthered by the Bishop of Manchester, Stanley Booth-Clibborn:

A spectrum of literature across the ages was cited (in support of these compromise amendments) by Lord Peston. Nonetheless the Bill passed second reading in the Lords before going to a whole house committee.

In that debate Lord Boyd-Carpenter cited a book display, and proposals for "gay books" to be present in a children's home and a gay pride week to be permissible in schools by named London councils. However, on questioning, he said, "of course, 'promotion' can be treated in different ways. If the clause becomes law it will be a matter for the courts to interpret in the sensible way in which the courts do interpret the law." The SDP peer Viscount Falkland with Lord Henderson of Brompton proposed another compromise amendment, the so-called "Arts Council" amendment, and remarked "There is a suggestion in the clause that in no way can a homosexual have a loving, caring or responsible relationship".

Lord Somers countered:

The narrowing amendment failed by a majority of 55 voting against it; and the Lords voted the clause through the following day by a majority of 80.

Michael Colvin MP thus on 8 March asked whether the minister, Christopher Chope, would discuss with the Association of London Authorities the level of expenditure by local authorities in London on support for gay and lesbian groups to which he replied:

The following day Tony Benn said during a debate in the House of Commons:

Mr Wilshire added that "there is an awful lot more promotion of homosexuality going on by local government outside classrooms", and the tempering amendments of that day's final debate were defeated by 53 votes.

Section 28 became law on 24 May 1988. The night before, several protests were staged by lesbians, including abseiling into Parliament and an invasion of the BBC1's Six O'Clock News, during which one woman managed to chain herself to Sue Lawley's desk and was sat on by the newsreader Nicholas Witchell.

Controversy over applicability
After Section 28 was passed, there was some debate as to whether it actually applied in schools or whether it applied only to local authorities. Whilst head teachers and Boards of Governors were specifically exempt, schools and teachers became confused as to what was actually permitted and tended to err on the side of caution.

A National Union of Teachers (NUT) statement remarked that "While Section 28 applies to local authorities and not to schools, many teachers believe, albeit wrongly, that it imposes constraints in respect of the advice and counselling they give to pupils. Professional judgement is therefore influenced by the perceived prospect of prosecution", and that it "limits the ability of local authorities to support schools in respect of learning and educating for equality. The effect of Section 28, therefore, is to inhibit anti discrimination initiatives and make it difficult for schools to prevent or address the serious problems that arise from homophobic bullying".

Similarly, the Department for Education and Science said that "Section 28 does not affect the activities of school governors, nor of teachers ... It will not prevent the objective discussion of homosexuality in the classroom, nor the counselling of pupils concerned about their sexuality", to which Knight responded by saying that "This has got to be a mistake. The major point of it was to protect children in schools from having homosexuality thrust upon them". In response to these criticisms, supporters of the bill claimed that the NUT and Department of Education were mistaken, and the section did affect schools.

Some local authorities continued to deliver training to their staff in their education system on how to deliver their services without discrimination against gay people; Manchester City Council continued to sustain four officer posts directly involved in policy making and implementation, contributing to the 1992 report Section 28 of the Local Government Act 1988: a Guide for Workers in the Education Service, produced by Manchester City Council, May 1992.

The Library Association (now CILIP) produced a briefing booklet for librarians with advice on how to avoid breaking the incoming law in 1988.

The Gay Librarians Group also organised against the law and encouraged their members to write to their unions, attend marches and had a regular newsletter at the time called 'Stop Clause 28'

Before its repeal, the influence of Section 28 had already been diminished: sex education in England and Wales has been regulated solely by the Secretary of State for Education since the Learning and Skills Act 2000 and the Education Act 1996. Nevertheless, many campaigners still saw abolishing Section 28 as "a symbolic measure against intolerance", and campaigned for its repeal.

Prosecutions and complaints
Although there were no successful prosecutions under the law, there were legal attempts to use it to stop the funding of LGBT and HIV/AIDS prevention initiatives.

In May 2000, Glasgow City Council halted funding to LGBT groups as local resident Sheena Strain (with the backing of the Christian Institute) took them to the Court of Session, objecting to her council tax being used for what she viewed as the promotion of homosexuality. In particular she objected to the funding of Project for HIV and Aids Care and Education (PHACE West), which produced and distributed a safe sex guide 'Gay Sex Now', which she considered pornographic. In July of the same year, she dropped the case, having reached agreement that the council would send a covering letter to grant recipients stating "You will not spend these monies for the purpose of promoting homosexuality nor shall they be used for the publication of any material which promotes homosexuality." The council had been intending to defend using the argument that PHACE West's principal activity was preventing the spread of HIV/AIDS, so was not promoting homosexuality. In the meantime the Scottish Parliament had passed the Ethical Standards in Public Life etc. (Scotland) Act 2000, which repealed the law.

Political response
The introduction of Section 28 served to galvanise the disparate British gay rights movement into action. The resulting protest saw the rise of now famous groups like Stonewall, started by, amongst other people, Ian McKellen and Michael Cashman, and OutRage!. Schools Out was formed in 1974 (as The Gay Teachers Association) and campaigned against the act, as well as supporting teachers on how to counter homophobia in schools. Many other groups not directly associated with LGBT rights also wanted the legislation removed, such as Gingerbread (a charity for single parents), the Family Planning Association and the Terrence Higgins Trust. Many in the labour movement and trade unions also opposed the legislation.

The issue began to divide the Conservative party, heightening divisions between party modernisers and social conservatives. In 1999, Conservative leader William Hague controversially sacked frontbencher Shaun Woodward for refusing to support the party line for Section 28's retention, prompting pro-gay rights Conservatives, such as Steve Norris, to speak out against the decision. 2000 saw gay Conservative advisor Ivan Massow defect to the Labour Party in response to the Conservative Party's continued support of Section 28. The Secondary Heads Association and NASUWT objected to repealing the legislation, saying that "it would be inappropriate to put parents and governors in charge of each school's sex education policy".

Repeal
On 7 February 2000, the first attempted legislation to repeal Section 28 was introduced by the Labour Government as part of the Local Government Act 2000, but was defeated by a House of Lords campaign led by Baroness Young. The then Shadow Education Secretary and future Prime Minister of the United Kingdom Theresa May called the defeat "a victory for commonsense".

In the Scottish Parliament, the repeal process was more successful. The Equality Network led the campaign in favour of scrapping Section 28, while various groups campaigned against the repeal. The Scottish millionaire businessman Brian Souter privately funded a postal ballot as part of his Keep the Clause campaign, which he claimed returned 86% support for keeping the clause, from a response from less than one third of the 3.9 million registered Scottish voters. The then Communities Minister, Wendy Alexander MSP, criticised the poll, stating "I think what is significant about today's ballot is that two out of three voters rejected, or binned or simply ignored this glorified opinion poll." Nicola Sturgeon of the SNP responded that the result showed that many Scots were concerned about repeal and said: "That is why the SNP have urged a policy for many months that we believe can provide people with the necessary reassurance, by providing a statutory underpinning to the guidelines, and resolve this difficult debate. We believe that the value of [heterosexual] marriage should be clearly referred to in the guidelines". Gay rights campaigner Peter Tatchell stated that "Brian Souter's support for Section 28 is the moral equivalent of the business-funded campaign to maintain racial segregation in the Deep South of the USA in the 1950s." Tatchell said that Souter's campaign was "hateful" and that it is clear that he was using his vast fortune to try to keep a cruel and "bigoted law" intact.
Despite Souter's efforts, Section 28 was repealed by MSPs as part of the Ethical Standards in Public Life Act on 21 June 2000 with a 99 to 17 majority vote with two abstentions. The 17 votes against were all Conservative MSPs.

Despite the previous reversals of the House of Commons by the House of Lords, backbench MPs introduced a fresh amendment to repeal Section 28 in England and Wales as part of another Local Government Bill in early 2003. In response to a further amendment tabled by Conservative MPs, that would have sent the matter to local referendums throughout the country, Edward Davey said "In a liberal democracy, the need to protect minorities properly sometimes means that protection cannot be achieved through the ballot box and that some things are not appropriate for a vote." After a backlash over the party leadership's attitude to gay rights, the Conservative Party allowed its MPs and peers a free vote on the repeal. The amendment was supported by the government and was passed by the Commons in March, by 368 to 76 (71 of the 76 against were Conservative MPs). With organised opposition in the Lords weakened by the death of Baroness Young, peers finally voted in favour of repeal by 180 to 130 in July.

On 18 September 2003, the Local Government Bill received Royal Assent as the Local Government Act 2003 and Section 28 was finally taken off the statute books. However, Kent County Council decided to create their own version of Section 28 to keep the effect of the now repealed law in their schools. This was replaced on 16 December 2004 with provisions stating that heterosexual marriage and family relationships are the only firm foundations for society, as the statement now says: "We will ensure that sex education values family and marriage as the foundation of a civilised society, and a firm basis for the nurturing of children". This was eventually quashed by the Equality Act 2010.

Support for Section 28
Section 28 was supported by religious groups such as the Salvation Army, the Christian Institute, Christian Action Research and Education, the Muslim Council of Britain, the Pentecostal British Union (a group of conservative Pentecostal churches) and groups within the Catholic Church and the Church of England. The Conservative Party, despite dissent within its ranks on the issue, whipped its members in support of Section 28 in 2000, but in 2003, after further dissent from within the party, allowed a free vote. In the House of Lords, the campaign against the repeal of Section 28 was led by Baroness Young, who died in 2002. Newspapers that strongly supported Section 28 included The Daily Mail, The Sun and The Daily Telegraph.

In Scotland, the most visible supporters of Section 28 were Brian Souter and the Daily Record newspaper.

The main argument in support of Section 28 was to protect children from "predatory homosexuals" and advocates seeking to "indoctrinate" vulnerable young people into homosexuality. Various other arguments were also used in support of Section 28 which are summarised as follows:

 That promotion of homosexuality in schools undermines marriage.
 That Section 28 prohibited only the promotion, not legitimate discussion of homosexuality.
 That Section 28 did not prevent the counselling of pupils who are being bullied.
 Proponents pointed to various polls in an attempt to demonstrate that public opinion favoured keeping Section 28.

Opposition

Gay rights advocates, such as Stonewall, OutRage!, Capital Gay, The Pink Paper and the Gay Times formed the major opposition to Section 28 and led the campaign for its repeal. Prominent individuals who spoke out for the repeal of Section 28 included Sir Ian McKellen, Michael Cashman, Ivan Massow, Mo Mowlam, Simon Callow, Annette Crosbie, Michael Grade, Jane Horrocks, Michael Mansfield QC, Helen Mirren, Claire Rayner, Ned Sherrin and Alan Moore.

A packed benefit held at the Piccadilly Theatre on 5 June 1988 called "Before the Act" mustered over 60 performers, among them Timothy West, Michael Cashman, Simon Rattle, Paul Eddington, Maureen Lipman, the Medici Quartet, the Pet Shop Boys, Maggie Ford, Sheila Hancock, Jill Bennett, Stephen Fry, Richard Griffiths, Harold Pinter, Joan Plowright, Anthony Sher, Ned Sherrin and Ian McKellen.

A coalition of comic book creators, including Alan Moore, Frank Miller, Robert Crumb, Art Spiegelman, Neil Gaiman, and many others, produced a comic anthology called AARGH and raised at least £17,000 to contribute to the fight against the legislation, according to Moore. Boy George wrote a song opposed to Section 28, entitled "No Clause 28". The band Chumbawamba recorded a single entitled "Smash Clause 28! Fight the Alton Bill!" which was an attack on Clause/Section 28 and a benefit for a gay rights group; it also featured 12 pages of hand printed notes relating to gay rights. The legislation was also opposed by some religious groups and leaders, such as Richard Harries, Bishop of Oxford. Newspapers that came out in opposition included The Guardian, The Independent and The Daily Mirror.

Political parties that were opposed to Section 28 included the Labour Party, the Liberal Democrats and the Green Party. In the House of Lords the campaign for repeal was led by openly gay peer Waheed Alli. Perhaps the most famous act of opposition to Section 28 came when Shaun Woodward, a Conservative MP with a transgender sister, defected from the Conservative Party and his seat and joined the ruling Labour Party in opposition to the Conservatives' continued support of Section 28.

The main point of argument claimed by opponents of Section 28 was the complaint that it discriminated against homosexuals and bisexuals, and hence was an intolerant and unjust law. Various other arguments were also used against Section 28 which are summarised as follows:

 That, by excluding homosexual support groups and appearing to prevent teachers from protecting victims of homophobic bullying, Section 28 was actually endangering vulnerable children.
 The claim that Section 28 made the assumption that homosexuals were inherently dangerous to children, implying an association between homosexuality, bisexuality and paedophilia, as obvious from the "predatory homosexuals" argument of the supporters of the law.
 Not only did Section 28 prevent the active promotion of homosexuality but also it appeared to give a legal reason to oppose it in schools and other forums if necessary.
 The claim that Section 28 was a law which gave an impression to the public that the government sanctioned homophobia.
 The idea that homosexuality could be "promoted" implied that homosexuality was a choice which people could be persuaded to make, in contrast to the Section's opponents' view that homosexuality is biologically determined.
 It was no longer relevant due to the Learning and Skills Act 2000 and the Education Act 1996.

In retrospect
Some prominent MPs who supported the bill when it was first introduced have since either expressed regret over their support, changed their stance due to different circumstances which have evolved over time, or have argued that the legislation is no longer necessary.

In an interview with gay magazine Attitude at the time of the 2005 general election, Michael Howard, then-Leader of the Conservative Party, commented: "[Section 28] was brought in to deal with what was seen to be a specific problem at the time. The problem was the kind of literature that was being used in some schools and distributed to very young children that was seen to promote homosexuality... I thought, rightly or wrongly, that there was a problem in those days. That problem simply doesn't exist now. Nobody's fussed about those issues any more. It's not a problem, so the law shouldn't be hanging around on the statute book".

In February 2006, then-Conservative Party Chairman Francis Maude told Pinknews.co.uk that the policy, which he had voted for, was wrong and a mistake.

In 2000, one year prior to his election to the House of Commons, Conservative Party member David Cameron repeatedly attacked the Labour Government's plans to abolish Section 28, publicly criticising then-Prime Minister Tony Blair as being "anti-family" and accusing him of wanting the "promotion of homosexuality in schools". At the 2001 general election, Cameron was elected as the Member of Parliament for Witney; he continued to support Section 28, voting against its repeal in 2003. The Labour Government were determined to repeal Section 28, and Cameron voted in favour of a Conservative amendment that retained certain aspects of the clause, which gay rights campaigners described as "Section 28 by the back door". The Conservative amendment was unsuccessful, and Section 28 was repealed by the Labour Government without concession, with Cameron absent for the vote on its eventual repeal.

However, in June 2009, Cameron, then-Leader of the Conservative Party, formally apologised for his party's introduction of the law, stating that it was a mistake and had been offensive to gay people. He restated this belief in January 2010, proposing to alter Conservative Party policy to reflect his belief that equality should be "embedded" in British schools.

Legacy 
In 2012, when the Coalition government launched its consultation into legalising same-sex marriages, Harrow East MP Bob Blackman suggested that David Cameron should resurrect Section 28, stating that he strongly believed that "Section 28 was the right rules to have in school so that we should not promote in any way shape or form promote same-sex relationships" and said he would be "very opposed" to seeing teachers being forced to say same-sex relationships are equivalent to heterosexual relationships. Shortly after, Blackman's Labour predecessor Tony McNulty branded him a "complete idiot" on Twitter.

In 2014, a Stonewall report on homophobic bullying in schools found that 37% of primary school teachers and 29% of secondary school teachers did not know if they were allowed to teach lessons on LGBT+ issues.

In 2015, Pink News accused the Evangelical Alliance's report to the Women and Equalities Select Committee's transgender inquiry, which said in part that "children should be protected from having to sort through [questions regarding sex or gender] before they reach an appropriate age" as reminiscent of Section 28.

After the Women and Equalities Select Committee recommended updating the Gender Recognition Act 2004 away from a medicalised approach and towards one based on statutory declarations in 2016, the ensuring and ongoing debate raised fears among some trans people that a new Section 28 could be introduced, especially after equalities minister Liz Truss said that government policy would be based in part on the principle "that the under 18s are protected from decisions that they could make, that are irreversible in the future." LGBT+ rights charity Stonewall stated that the government rhetoric "sounds similar to how young lesbian, gay and bi people were spoken about in the 1980s."

In 2016, research by Janine Walker and Jo Bates found that Section 28 still had a lasting effect on school libraries, with very little LGBTQ+ literature available or support from librarians being given. Later in 2019, John Vincent said that through his research he still met British librarians who assumed Section 28 was still in place.

A 2018 study from Anglia Ruskin University found that only 20% of LGBT+ teachers who had taught under Section 28 were openly LGBT+, whereas almost 90% of those had been trained after the repeal of the law were. The study additionally found that 40% of the teachers from the Section 28 era saw their LGBT+ identity as incompatible with their role as teachers, whereas only 13% of the post-Section 28 era teachers did.

Academies 
Section 28 received renewed attention in late 2011, when Michael Gove, in Clause 28 of the Model Funding Agreement for academies and free schools, added the stipulation that the benefits of marriage be taught in schools. Although the clause does not explicitly mention sexual orientation, with same-sex marriage not being legal at the time, it prompted The Daily Telegraph (traditionally supportive of the Conservative Party) to draw comparisons between the two clauses.

Academies and the Department for Education came under greater scrutiny in August 2013, when LGBT activists, in co-ordination with the British Humanist Association (BHA), identified over forty schools whose policies either replicated the language of Section 28 in their sex and relationship education (SRE) policies or were "unhelpfully vague" on the issue. Several of the schools highlighted by the BHA included the Evelyn Grace Academy chain of faith schools – which opened after the repeal of Section 28, Tasker-Milward V.C. School, whose SRE policy, dating from 2008, implied the clause was still in force, and The Northumberland Church of England Academy, who was listed as a School Champion by LGBT rights charity Stonewall and whose staff spoke at Stonewall's 2013 Education for All Conference. In light of the media coverage, the Welsh Government announced an investigation into the Tasker-Milward School, and the Department for Education, announcing its own investigation, stated that schools were prohibited under DfE guidance from discriminating on the basis of sexual orientation.

Cultural depictions
Margaret Thatcher Queen of Soho (2013), a drag comedy musical play, displays what life would have been like if Margaret Thatcher had got lost in Soho on the eve of the vote for Section 28. It was produced in December 2013 by Jon Brittain, Aine Flanagan, Matt Tedford at Theatre503 in London.

Next Lesson (2015) is a comedy drama written by Chris Woodley which explores Section 28 in a fictional South East London school from 1988 to 2006. The play was first performed at The Pleasance Theatre, London in 2015. To mark the thirtieth anniversary of Section 28 a new production was staged at Above The Stag Theatre London in August 2018. A staged reading was also performed in The House of Lords by The BRIT School in June 2018.

Russell T. Davies included a scene in the TV series Queer as Folk (1999) with a classmate of the gay schoolboy Nathan stopping a teacher discussing an author's sexuality with "You can't teach us about poofs. You're not allowed.". He referenced it again in It's A Sin (2021), where gay schoolteacher Ash is ordered to remove books from the school library which reference homosexuality, following the introduction of the law in 1988.

The Outrage (2021) by British author William Hussey is a dystopian novel set in future England, overtaken by a far-right government which prosecutes LGBT people. The government gets its power to do so from a fictive law called Section 28, named after the 1988 law.

Blue Jean (2022) depicts the struggles of a young lesbian teacher in the north east of England as she comes to terms with her sexuality against the background of the passage of Clause 28 in 1988.

See also

 LGBT rights in the United Kingdom
 LGBT History Month
 Briggs Initiative
 Thatcherism
 Censorship of LGBT issues
 Russian LGBT propaganda law – similar law introduced in Russia in 2013
 Florida Parental Rights in Education Act – similar law passed in Florida in 2022
 LGBT ideology-free zones - similar laws introduced by over 100 municipalities in Poland
 "Promotion of homosexuality"

Explanatory notes

Citations

General and cited sources 

 
 
  (Full text of the section)
  (Newspaper clippings from 1989 demonstrating use of Section 28 to close LGBT student groups and cease distribution of material exploring gay issues)
  (article on Section 28 and the book that caused the controversy, Jenny lives with Eric and Martin, by author, Susanne Bosche)
   (History of Section 28 with notes on attempted legislation that led up to the final amendment)
  (Notes and links on Section 28 from a humanist perspective, with notes on usage of the Section 2a name.)
  (Potted history of Section 28 from 2000)
  (USSU National Policy Issues detailing notes on heightened violence against gays and lesbians in the lead-up to Section 28 enactment)
  (Report of gay Conservative Ivan Massow's defection to the Labour Party)
  (Nicholas Witchell's encounter with Section 28 protesters)
   (Statement by the NUT on the controversy of applicability of Section 28)
  (Knight's response to the controversy of applicability of Section 28)
  (Brian Souter's Keep the Clause campaign runs unofficial poll to discredit reformers)
  (Summary of points in support of Section 28)

External links
 
 
 
 Royal Assent of the Local Government 1988

1988 in law
1988 in LGBT history
1988 in the United Kingdom
Activism
Censorship of LGBT issues
Conservatism in the United Kingdom
Homophobia
Laws in the United Kingdom
LGBT history in the United Kingdom
LGBT law in the United Kingdom
LGBT-related controversies in the United Kingdom